Qoʻrgʻontepa is a small city and seat of Qoʻrgʻontepa District, in Andijan Region in eastern Uzbekistan. In 1989 it had a population of 19,565, and 30,800 in 2016.
In 1976 Qo’rg’ontepa was granted city status. The city has a cotton factory, a tool factory and sewing factory. The city is located on the Uzbek Railways Andijan-Karasu line.

References

Populated places in Andijan Region
Cities in Uzbekistan